Magna Publishing Group, Inc. is an American publishing company headquartered in Paramus, New Jersey.  Founded in 1975, the company publishes a number of magazine titles and is one of the largest publishers of pornographic magazines in the United States with titles such as Club, Swank, Genesis, Gallery, Gent, as well as "nearly 60 total adult titles".  The Company has only 1 to 10 employees. On December 22, 2015, Magna Publishing Group was purchased by 1-800-PHONESEX for an undisclosed amount.

Adult magazines

 200 Uncensored Sex Acts
 300 Uncensored Sex Acts
 500 Uncensored Sex Acts
 Best of Club
 Best of Genesis
 Best of Genesis: Red Hot Amateurs
 Black Diamonds
 Black Lust
 Buf
 Burning Angel
 Butt Lust
 Celebrity Skin
 Cheeks
 Cheri
 Cherry Pop
 Cherry Pie
 Cleavage Magazine
 Club
 Club International
 Club Confidential
 D-Cup
 Finally Legal
 Fox
 Fox XXXtreme
 Friends & Lovers
 Gallery
 Genesis
 Genesis Presents Eager Beavers
 Genesis Presents: Ripe
 Gent
 Gent Big Boobs
 Gent Monster Tits
 Girls of the Orient
 Girls Over 40
 Girls/Girls XXX Video
 Hawk
 Hawk Presents
 High Society
 Hometown Girls
 Hot Asians
 Hot 'n Older
 Just 18
 Leg Action
 Leg Love
 Leg World
 Legal & Tender
 Lesbian Licks
 Lesbian Lust
 Lollypops
 Nugget
 Petite
 Playgirl
 Plumpers
 Purely 18
 Red Hot Amateurs
 Sex Acts
 Stag
 Swank
 Swank's Anal Action
 Swank's Big Boobs
 Swank Extreme
 Swank's Innocence
 Swank's Lesbian Licks
 Swank's Lesbian Lust
 Swank's Open Legs & Lace
 Swank Pleasure: Uncensored Sex
 Swank's Shaved Sex Action
 Swank's Uncensored
 Swank's Uncensored Sex
 Swank's X-tasy
 Sweet 18
 Ultra for Men
 Uncensored Sex
 Uncensored Sex Scenes
 Velvet
 Video World
 Vivid SuperXXXHeroes Magazine

Titles published under the name "Enoble Media Group":

 Black Men
 Braids and Beauty
 Carblite
 Cosplay Culture
 Digital Camera
 Faces
 Handheld Computing
 Hit Parader
 Hype Hair
 Michael Jackson Tribute
 Popstar!
 Rebel Ink
 Right On!
 Skin & Ink
 Skinz
 SSX
 Tattoo
 Teen Dream
 Today's Black Woman
 Urban Ink
 Word Up!

References 

Adult magazine publishing companies
Companies based in Bergen County, New Jersey
Publishing companies established in 1975
Magazine publishing companies of the United States
Pornography in New Jersey
Privately held companies based in New Jersey
1975 establishments in New Jersey